Oceanian (Australasian, Melanesian, Micronesian, and Polynesian) literature developed in isolation from the rest of the world and in a unique geographical environment. This allowed the development of a unique literature to thrive. Oceanian literature was heavily influenced by religion and ritual. This can be seen by the large amount of religious symbolism featured in it.

Another major influence in Oceanian society was its intricate oral tradition. For a long time, most Oceanian literature was not written down. As a result, stock formulas and rhyming were used in many works (these traits made it easier to memorize). Gods, creation myths, and spirits are also prominent in Oceanian literature, showcasing again the influence oral tradition had on the literature of Oceania.

Modern Oceanian literature is mainly written in the English language but also feature different languages and speech. Literatures of Oceania particularly that of the Pacific have long been isolated from mainstream and traditional movements of literature in the West. The ocean carries a lot of symbolism and meaning to the cultures and people that have travelled through, in which largely has impacted the literary cultures and historical narratives in Oceania.

List of countries and territories

Prominent writers by country

Australia

Fiji

French Polynesia

Kiribati

Marshall Islands

Micronesia, Federated States of

Nauru

New Zealand

Palau

Papua New Guinea

Samoa

Solomon Islands

Tonga

Tuvalu

Vanuatu

See also

African literature
Asian literature
Latin American literature
Oceanian culture
Western literature

References

Citations 
'Oceanic literature', Guiart, Jean in Encyclopædia Britannica. Retrieved on December 14, 2007.
Goetzfridt, Nicholas J. (1995). Indigenous Literature of Oceania: A Survey of Criticism and Interpretation, Westport, CT: Greenwood Press.